Douglas T. Breeden is the William W. Priest Professor of Finance and former Dean of the Fuqua School of Business, Duke University. 

He is best known for establishing the use of state prices in financial economics, 
 
and for his work on the Consumption CAPM.
 
He was the International Association for Quantitative Finance “Financial Engineer of the Year 2013”, and was Founding Editor of the Journal of Fixed Income. 
He holds a Ph.D. in Finance from Stanford and an S.B. in Management Science from M.I.T.

References

Duke_University_faculty
Massachusetts Institute of Technology alumni
Stanford University alumni
Financial economists
Year of birth missing (living people)
Living people